The Chinese Ambassador to Equatorial Guinea is the official representative of the People's Republic of China to the Republic of Equatorial Guinea.

List of representatives

References 

 
Equatorial Guinea
China